Bliksvær or Briksvær is an island group in the Vestfjorden in Bodø Municipality in Nordland county, Norway.

There are about 60 islands and islets in the Bliksvær group. They are all low and grassy with no trees.  The only inhabited island is Bliksvær island. There were 5 inhabitants in 2017.

Most of the nature reserve is not land, but ocean to protect the habitat of the sea birds and seals. 

The island group is served by the Bodø-Ytre Gildeskål fast passenger boat route.

See also
List of islands of Norway

References

Bodø
Islands of Nordland
Ramsar sites in Norway